"Amanheceu" is a song by Brazilian singer Lu Andrade. The track was released as the second single from his solo career. This song is a tribute to his late father.

Composition
Her second single, "Amanheceu" is a Folk and Indie pop ballad written after her father, who died in 2007. The song was arranged by her band members Fabio Russo (guitar) and Fabrício Fruet (cello), produced by Renato Patriarca.

Track listing

Release history

References

2014 singles
2014 songs
Lu Andrade songs
Portuguese-language songs
Folk ballads